Aegoschema obesum is a species of beetle in the family Cerambycidae. It was described by Bates in 1861.

References

Acanthoderini
Beetles described in 1861